Epsilon (uppercase , lowercase  or lunate) is the fifth letter of the Greek alphabet, corresponding phonetically to a mid front unrounded vowel  or . In the system of Greek numerals it also has the value five. It was derived from the Phoenician letter He . Letters that arose from epsilon include the Roman E, Ë and Ɛ, and Cyrillic Е, È, Ё, Є and Э.

The uppercase form of epsilon is identical to Latin E but has its own code point in Unicode: . The lowercase version has two typographical variants, both inherited from medieval Greek handwriting. One, the most common in modern typography and inherited from medieval minuscule, looks like a reversed number "3" and is encoded . The other, also known as lunate or uncial epsilon and inherited from earlier uncial writing, looks like a semicircle crossed by a horizontal bar: it  is encoded . While in normal typography these are just alternative font variants, they may have different meanings as mathematical symbols: computer systems therefore offer distinct encodings for them. In TeX, \epsilon denotes the lunate form, while \varepsilon denotes the reversed-3 form.

There is also a 'Latin epsilon',  or "open e", which looks similar to the Greek lowercase epsilon. The lunate or uncial epsilon provided inspiration for the euro sign, .

The lunate epsilon, is not to be confused with the set membership symbol ; nor should the Latin uppercase epsilon, be confused with the Greek uppercase  (sigma). The symbol , first used in set theory and logic by Giuseppe Peano and now used in mathematics in general for set membership ("belongs to") evolved from the letter epsilon, since the symbol was originally used as an abbreviation for the Latin word . Only gradually did a fully separate, stylized symbol take the place of epsilon in this role. In a related context, Peano also introduced the use of a backwards epsilon, for the phrase "such that", although the abbreviation s.t. is occasionally used in place of ϶ in informal cardinals.

History

Origin
The letter Ε was adopted from the Phoenician letter He when Greeks first adopted alphabetic writing. In archaic Greek writing, its shape is often still identical to that of the Phoenician letter. Like other Greek letters, it could face either leftward or rightward (inline|x14px), depending on the current writing direction, but, just as in Phoenician, the horizontal bars always faced in the direction of writing. Archaic writing often preserves the Phoenician form with a vertical stem extending slightly below the lowest horizontal bar. In the classical era, through the influence of more cursive writing styles, the shape was simplified to the current E glyph.

Sound value
Besides its classical Greek sound value, the short  phoneme, it could initially also be used for other -like sounds. For instance, in early Attic before c. 500 BC, it was used also both for the long, open , and for the long close . In the former role, it was later replaced in the classic Greek alphabet by Eta (Η), which was taken over from eastern Ionic alphabets, while in the latter role it was replaced by the digraph spelling ΕΙ.

Epichoric alphabets
Some dialects used yet other ways of distinguishing between various e-like sounds.

The letter Beta, in turn, took the deviant shape .

In Sicyon, a variant glyph resembling an X was used in the same function as Corinthian .

This tack glyph was used elsewhere also as a form of "Heta", i.e. for the sound .

Glyph variants
After the establishment of the canonical classical Ionian (Euclidean) Greek alphabet, new glyph variants for Ε were introduced through handwriting. In the uncial script (used for literary papyrus manuscripts in late antiquity and then in early medieval vellum codices), the "lunate" shape became predominant. In cursive handwriting, a large number of shorthand glyphs came to be used, where the cross-bar and the curved stroke were linked in various ways. Some of them resembled a modern lowercase Latin "e", some a "6" with a connecting stroke to the next letter starting from the middle, and some a combination of two small "c"-like curves. Several of these shapes were later taken over into minuscule book hand. Of the various minuscule letter shapes, the inverted-3 form became the basis for lower-case Epsilon in Greek typography during the modern era.

Uses

International Phonetic Alphabet
Despite its pronunciation as mid, in the International Phonetic Alphabet, the Latin epsilon  represents open-mid front unrounded vowel, as in the English word pet .

Symbol
The uppercase Epsilon is not commonly used outside of the Greek language because of its similarity to the Latin letter E. However, it is commonly used in structural mechanics with Young's Modulus equations for calculating tensile, compressive and areal strain.

The Greek lowercase epsilon , the lunate epsilon symbol , and the Latin lowercase epsilon  (see above) are used in a variety of places:

 In engineering mechanics, strain calculations ϵ = increase of length / original length. Usually this relates to extensometer testing of metallic materials.
 In mathematics 
 (particularly calculus), an infinitesimally small positive quantity is commonly denoted ε; see (ε, δ)-definition of limit.
 Hilbert introduced epsilon terms  as an extension to first-order logic; see epsilon calculus.
 it is used to represent the Levi-Civita symbol.
 it is sometimes used to denote the Heaviside step function.
 in set theory, the epsilon numbers are ordinal numbers that satisfy the fixed point ε = ωε. The first epsilon number, ε0, is the limit ordinal of the set {ω, ωω, ωωω, ...}.
 in numerical analysis and statistics it is used as the error term
 in group theory it is used as the idempotent group when e is in use as a variable name
 In computer science
 it often represents the empty string, though different writers use a variety of other symbols for the empty string as well; usually the lower-case Greek letter lambda (λ).
 the machine epsilon indicates the upper bound on the relative error due to rounding in floating point arithmetic.
 In physics, 
 it indicates the permittivity of a medium; with the subscript 0 (ε0) it is the permittivity of free space.
 it can also indicate the strain of a material (a ratio of extensions).
 In automata theory, it shows a transition that involves no shifting of an input symbol.
 In astronomy, 
 it stands for the fifth-brightest star in a constellation (see Bayer designation).
 Epsilon is the name for the most distant and most visible ring of Uranus.
 In planetary science, ε denotes the axial tilt.
 In chemistry, it represents the molar extinction coefficient of a chromophore.
 In economics, ε refers to elasticity.
 In statistics, 
 it is used to refer to error terms.
 it also can to refer to the degree of sphericity in repeated measures ANOVAs.
 In agronomy, it is used to represent the "photosynthetic efficiency" of a particular plant or crop.

Unicode

 Greek Epsilon

 Coptic Eie

 Latin Open E

 Mathematical Epsilon

These characters are used only as mathematical symbols. Stylized Greek text should be encoded using the normal Greek letters, with markup and formatting to indicate text style.

Initial

References

Further reading 

Hoffman, Paul; The Man Who Loved Only Numbers. Hyperion, 1998. .

Greek letters
Vowel letters